(born May 20, 1973) is a Japanese judoka.

He won Asian silver medal in the half-lightweight division in 1996 Asian Judo Championships. In November 2012 Torii took 5th in the World Sambo Championships in Minsk.

References 

Living people
Japanese male judoka
1973 births
20th-century Japanese people
21st-century Japanese people